Emma Robinson (born November 26, 1971 in Montreal, Quebec) is a Canadian rower. Robinson won two medals (silver and bronze) at the Summer Olympics as part of the women's eight rowing teams for Canada in 1996 in Atlanta and the 2000 Summer Olympics in Sydney. Robinson is also a three time world champion in the women's coxless pairs, when she won gold from 1997 to 1999, she has an additional silver medal, and three bronze, for a total of seven World Rowing Championships medals. She was named the Pairs Team of the Year at the National Sports Awards, winning in 1997 with Alison Korn and in 1999 with Theresa Luke.

Career
Robinson won her first World Rowing Championship medal in 1993 as part of the women's coxless four that won bronze for Canada. Competing in the 1996 Summer Olympics, she rowed with Anna Van der Kamp in the coxless pairs but would finish fifth in the final. Robinson would win a silver though as part of the women's eight at those Olympics. At the next three Rowing World Championships she won the gold medal, first with Alison Korn in 1997 and 1998, and finally with Theresa Luke in 1999. Robinson overcame a thyroid cancer surgery in March 1999, despite the major health concern she competed on the women's eight team that won bronze at the 2000 Summer Olympics in Sydney. As the reigning three-time World Champions, Robinson and Luke were a medal favourite going into the women's coxless pairs in Sydney. That year though, they had struggled in races against the Romanian and Australian teams, ultimately the pair would finish fourth at the Olympics. After the disappointing finish and recovery from cancer, Robinson stopped competing in the coxless pairs and instead only rowed on the Canadian women's eight team in 2001 before retiring.

Personal
Born in Montreal, Robinson grew up in Winnipeg, Manitoba. She went to high school at St. John's-Ravenscourt School in Winnipeg, graduating in 1989, and was named to the school's Sports Hall of Fame in 2009. Robinson would go on to row and study at the University of Toronto where she would study medicine, completing her studies in 2002, and then going on to two years of residency as a physician. She was inducted to the U of T's Sports Hall of Fame in 2006. After her rowing career she works as radiologist in Belleville, Ontario.

References

External links
 
 
 
 

1971 births
Living people
Anglophone Quebec people
Canadian female rowers
Rowers from Montreal
Rowers at the 1996 Summer Olympics
Rowers at the 2000 Summer Olympics
Olympic silver medalists for Canada
Olympic bronze medalists for Canada
Olympic rowers of Canada
Olympic medalists in rowing
World Rowing Championships medalists for Canada
Medalists at the 2000 Summer Olympics
Medalists at the 1996 Summer Olympics
Rowers at the 1999 Pan American Games
Pan American Games gold medalists for Canada
Pan American Games medalists in rowing
Medalists at the 1999 Pan American Games
20th-century Canadian women